Ballet West is an American ballet company based in Salt Lake City, Utah. It was founded in 1963 as the Utah Civic Ballet by Willam F. Christensen, the company's first artistic director, and Glenn Walker Wallace, who served as its first president. Christensen had previously established the first ballet department in an American university at the University of Utah in 1951.

In 1968, the Federation of Rocky Mountain States chose the company to represent that group, and by extension, to represent the western United States.  Due to that choice, the group's name was changed to Ballet West.  This is not to be confused with Ballet West in Taynuilt, Scotland.

The Ballet West Academy is the official school of Ballet West and is located in Salt Lake City. 

Ballet West was featured in the reality TV series Breaking Pointe in the Summer of 2012 and 2013 aired on the CW Network, part of a BBC Production.

History of Ballet West
Ballet West was established in Salt Lake City in 1963.  Willam F. Christensen was the company's first artistic director, co-founding the company together with Utah's “First Lady of the Arts” Glenn Walker Wallace. In 1951, Christensen had established the first ballet department in an American university at The University of Utah and with the tireless assistance of Mrs. Enid Cosgriff this program grew into the Utah Civic Ballet, Ballet West's first incarnation.  But this was not the first ballet company Willam Christensen's founded. Along with his brothers Lew and Harold, Christensen made history by establishing the oldest ballet company in the western United States, the San Francisco Ballet.  There he went on to create the first full-length American productions of Coppélia, Swan Lake, and The Nutcracker, which remains in Ballet West's repertoire to this day.

A 20th Century ballet pioneer, Christensen developed a distinctly American and theatrical repertoire for his company based on his early training in Utah and New York City as well as his years traversing the American Vaudeville circuit. He also built a strong connection to the works of George Balanchine. In 1975 Christensen invited the great American dancer Bruce Marks to join him as Ballet West's Co-Artistic Director. Marks became Artistic Director in 1978 when Christensen retired.  Under Marks’ direction, the company presented its first full production of Swan Lake and it earned a reputation for developing emerging choreographers of the time. Also during this period Marks made history, along with his wife, the acclaimed Danish Ballerina, Toni Lander, by presenting the first American full-length production of Abdallah by renowned 19th Century Danish choreographer, August Bournonville. John Hart, CBE, former dancer, administrator, and Assistant Director of The Royal Ballet in England succeeded Marks as Artistic Director of Ballet West In 1985.  Under his leadership, the company's repertoire was expanded to include more well-loved 19th Century classics such as The Sleeping Beauty. Hart further enriched the company's repertoire of ballets with the works of many early 20th Century masters, most notably the great English choreographer, Sir Frederick Ashton. From 1985 to 1996, Hart engaged San Francisco-based Val Caniparoli as Ballet West's resident choreographer.  Dancer and choreographer Jonas Kåge served as Artistic Director from 1997 to 2006.  During this time Kåge maintained Ballet West's repertoire of classics while revitalizing its profile with notable late 20th Century choreographers such as Christopher Bruce, Hans van Manen, Glen Tetley and William Forsythe.

Artistic directors
The founding artistic director, Willam Christensen, retired in 1978. He was succeeded by Bruce Marks, who had been co-artistic director since 1975. Starting in 1985, the company's third artistic director was John Hart, CBE, a former dancer, administrator, and assistant director of The Royal Ballet. From 1997 through 2006, the position belonged to Jonas Kåge, a dancer and choreographer.

The company's fifth and current artist director is Adam Sklute, who has served in that capacity since 2007. Sklute was dancer, ballet master and associate director with The Joffrey Ballet.

Dance company 
Dancers with Ballet West as of August 2022 include:

Principal dancers

First soloists

Soloists

Demi-soloists

Corps de ballet 

 Jazz Khai Bynum
 Lillian Casscells
 Beau Chesivoir
 Isabella Corridon
 Amelia Dencker
 Nicole Fanney
 Robert Fowler
 Connor Hammond
 Jacob Hancock
 Noel Jensen
 Vinicius Lima
 Joseph Lynch
 Amber Miller
 Rylee Ann Rogers
 Anisa Sinteral
 Tatiana Stevenson
 Victoria Vassos
 Loren Walton 
 Claire Wilson

Ballet West II, Second Company Artists 

 Stella Birkinshaw
 Micheal Bushman
 Kye Cooley
 Anderson Duhan
 Maren Florence
 Luca Freudenberg
 Victor Galeana
 Elijah Hartley
 Schuyler Lian
 William Lynch
 Jonas Malinka-Thompson
 Lexi McCloud
 Julia Outmesguine
 Kennedy Sheriff
 Rebecca Trockel
 Kaeli Ware

Memorable Dancers

References

External links

West Ballet
1963 establishments in Utah
Performing groups established in 1963
Dance in Utah
Non-profit organizations based in Utah